Hugh Royer III (born February 13, 1964) is an American professional golfer and golf instructor. He is the son of Hugh Royer Jr., who played on the PGA Tour for 14 years and won the 1970 Western Open.

Royer was born in Columbus, Georgia and spent the majority of his childhood traveling with his father on Tour.

Royer received a scholarship to Mississippi State University where he played for two years. In those two seasons, Royer had one tournament win and seven top-10 finishes, and held the low stroke average each year. He then transferred to Columbus State University for his junior and senior years, where his father served as head golf coach. He was NCAA Division II Player of the Year and First Team All-American in 1985 and 1986. He was named 1987 Amateur Player of the Year by the Carolinas Golf Reporter.

In the summer following his senior year at CSU, he won the Georgia State Amateur Championship by one stroke over Allen Doyle. Two weeks later, he defeated Doyle again in the Southeastern Amateur by five strokes setting a record at 20 under par - a record not broken until 2017. Because of open-heart surgery, Royer was forced to withdraw from the U.S. Amateur later that year. Shortly after his recovery, Royer won the Azalea Amateur Invitational in Charleston, South Carolina in a playoff and won the Western Amateur. This gave the Western Golf Association the only father-son combination to win the Open and Amateur in their history.

Royer turned professional in 1987. He competed on the South African Tour for six years, where he had one tournament win and several runner-up finishes.  

He started playing on the Nike Tour in 1991 and won his first title in 1993 in Florence, South Carolina at the Nike South Carolina Classic. Later that year, he won again in Texarkana, Arkansas at the Nike Texarkana Open. In 1995, he won the Nike Dominion Open and the Nike Permian Basin Open. Royer gained his PGA Tour card that year and retained it until 1998. He had four top-10 finishes. He competed on the Nationwide Tour in 1999 and 2000 before retiring.

Learning the game from his father and some top instructors gave Royer the desire to teach the game to others, especially to those who desire to play professionally. Royer's knowledge of the game, in addition to his playing experience, provided him with an adequate teaching philosophy that has proven successful among his own stable of students.

Royer worked for three years at the International Junior Golf Academy on Hilton Head Island where he trained the 2005 U.S. Girls' Junior champion, In-Kyung Kim, among other successful junior and collegiate players.

In 2007, Royer opened the Champions Golf Academy at the Long Bay Club in Myrtle Beach, South Carolina. The Champions Golf Academy is a specialized golf academy that provides instruction and individualized training programs for players of all levels, gap-year students, collegiate players, and amateurs.

Royer was inducted into the Columbus State University Athletic Hall of Fame in 2000.

Royer and his wife, Heather, reside in Myrtle Beach, and have five children: Leighanne, Sydney, Brai, Abbey and Hugh Royer IV.

Amateur wins
1985 NCAA Division II Championship
1986 Georgia State Amateur, Southeastern Amateur
1987 Azalea Invitational, Western Amateur

Professional wins (5)

Sunshine Tour wins (1)
1991 Hollard Royal Swazi Sun Classic

Nike Tour wins (4)

Nike Tour playoff record (1–0)

See also
1995 Nike Tour graduates
1997 PGA Tour Qualifying School graduates
List of golfers with most Web.com Tour wins

External links

Champions Golf Academy in Myrtle Beach, South Carolina

American male golfers
Mississippi State Bulldogs golfers
PGA Tour golfers
Korn Ferry Tour graduates
Golfers from Georgia (U.S. state)
Sportspeople from Columbus, Georgia
1964 births
Living people